The 2018 CONCACAF League Final was the final round of the 2018 CONCACAF League, the second edition of the CONCACAF League, the secondary club football tournament organised by CONCACAF, the regional governing body of North America, Central America, and the Caribbean.

The final was contested in two-legged home-and-away format between Herediano from Costa Rica and Motagua from Honduras. The first leg was hosted by Herediano at the Estadio Eladio Rosabal Cordero in Heredia on 25 October 2018, while the second leg was hosted by Motagua at the Estadio Tiburcio Carías Andino in Tegucigalpa on 1 November 2018.

Herediano won the final 3–2 on aggregate for their first CONCACAF League title.

Teams

For the second consecutive season, the final of the CONCACAF League was competed between teams from Costa Rica and Honduras.

Venues

Road to the final

Note: In all results below, the score of the finalist is given first (H: home; A: away).

Format
The final was played on a home-and-away two-legged basis, with the team with the better performance in previous rounds hosting the second leg.

The away goals rule would not be applied, and extra time would be played if the aggregate score was tied after the second leg. If the aggregate score was still tied after extra time, the penalty shoot-out would be used to determine the winner (Regulations II, Article G).

Performance ranking

Matches

First leg

Second leg

See also
2019 CONCACAF Champions League

Notes

References

External links

Final
2018
2018–19 in Costa Rican football
2018–19 in Honduran football
Sports competitions in San José, Costa Rica
International association football competitions hosted by Honduras
International association football competitions hosted by Costa Rica
October 2018 sports events in North America
November 2018 sports events in North America
C.S. Herediano matches
F.C. Motagua matches